Llapi Besianë Podujevë is a Kosovo football club based in the city of Podujevo. The club compete in the Superliga.

Footnotes

2
Kos